Baruch Awerbuch (born 1958) is an Israeli-American computer scientist and a professor of computer science at Johns Hopkins University. He is known for his research on distributed computing.

Academic biography
Awerbuch was educated at the Technion in Haifa, Israel, earning a bachelor's degree in 1978, a master's degree in 1982, and a Ph.D. in 1984 under the supervision of Shimon Even. He worked at the Massachusetts Institute of Technology as a postdoctoral researcher, faculty member in applied mathematics, and research associate in computer science from 1984 until 1994, when he joined the Johns Hopkins faculty.

Awerbuch's former doctoral students include UCSD professor George Varghese.

Research contributions
Awerbuch has published many highly cited research papers on topics including
Cryptographic primitives for verifiable secret sharing and fault tolerant broadcasting
Synchronization of asynchronous distributed systems
Network routing methods that are both fault-tolerant and have a highly competitive throughput

Awards and honors
Awerbuch and David Peleg were the 2008 winners of the Edsger W. Dijkstra Prize in Distributed Computing for their work on sparse partitions.

References

External links
Home page at Johns Hopkins

1958 births
Living people
American computer scientists
Israeli computer scientists
Theoretical computer scientists
Researchers in distributed computing
Technion – Israel Institute of Technology alumni
Johns Hopkins University faculty
Israeli emigrants to the United States
Dijkstra Prize laureates